Young Turks was a reform movement during the last years of the Ottoman Empire. The phrase young Turks is used more generally for young people who agitate for political or other reform, or who have a rebellious disposition.

Young Turks may also refer to:

Politics
 Young Turks (U.S. politics), a group of Republicans in the 1960s
 Young Turks (Thailand), a clique of military officers which played an important role in the coups during the 1970s and 1980s
 Young Turks, a group of officers who helped Nguyễn Khánh stay in power in the September 1964 South Vietnamese coup attempt
 Young Turks, a group of New Zealand National Party politicians critical of their party's senior leadership in the early 1960s consisting of Robert Muldoon, Duncan MacIntyre, and Peter Gordon
 Andrea Orlando, Italian politician nicknamed "Young Turk"

Groups
 Young Turks (Bell Labs), a group of influential scientists who worked at Bell Labs

Gangs
 Young Turks, a Philadelphia street gang under Mafia boss Joey Merlino
 A group of young Italian-American mafia members that opposed the Mustache Pete (or old guard) in the early days of the American mafia

Books
 Young Turk (Moris Farhi novel), 2004

Media
 The Young Turks (TYT), a U.S.-based progressive, left-wing YouTube show that additionally appears on selected television channels.

Music
 Young Turks (record label), former name of British independent record label Young
 "Young Turks" (song), a 1981 song by Rod Stewart
 Young Turk (rapper), an American rapper